Ansar Ali Siddiqui was a Bangladesh Nationalist Party politician and the former Member of Parliament of Sirajganj-6.

Career
Siddiqui was elected to parliament from Sirajganj-6 as a Bangladesh Nationalist Party candidate in 1991. He served as the state minister for Irrigation, Water Development and Flood Control.

Death
Siddiqui died on 16 April 2013 in BIRDEM hospital, Dhaka, Bangladesh.

References

Bangladesh Nationalist Party politicians
2013 deaths
5th Jatiya Sangsad members
6th Jatiya Sangsad members
Water Resources ministers